Go Straight may refer to:
 Go Straight (1921 film), directed by William Worthington
 Go Straight (1925 film), directed by Frank O'Connor